Abbey, Schoeffel and Grau was a US theatre management and production firm, active from 1880 until 1896. The partners were Henry E. Abbey, John B. Schoeffel and Maurice Grau. Abbey and Schoeffel had been in partnership since 1876, and joined forces with Grau in 1882. They managed and ran a number of theatres in New York and Boston, including the  Metropolitan Opera House ("the old Met") in 1883-4 and from 1891 to 1896, when Abbey died. Schoeffel and Grau remained at the Met until 1903.

Although individual biographies may individually credit them with bringing various singing, instrumental and acting stars to the US, the overall credit can be shared by all three, acting as a successful partnership for some sixteen years. Grau and Schoeffel had their own success from 1896 until 1903.

History
Henry Abbey and John Schoeffel became partners in the theatre business in 1876, Abbey dealing with the artiste management and Schoeffel looking after the business side. They began by hiring the Academy of Music, Buffalo, NY (1852–1956) in 1876–7 with Lotta, and later at Abbey's Park Theatre from 1876 to 1882 (when it burned down). In Boston they rebuilt the Beethoven Hall as the Park Theatre in 1879. They took the lease of Booth's Theatre, New York City, from Dion Boucicault on 1 January 1880 until 1 May 1881. On 8 March 1880 they formed the company of Abbey and Schoeffel.

They engaged Helena Modjeska and Sarah Bernhardt at Booth's Theatre in 1880 and 1881, and secured the lease of the Grand Opera House (formerly Pike's Opera House) in 1882. They managed Christina Nilsson, Henry Irving and Lillie Langtry on tours of the US; the latter's début was delayed when Abbey's New Park Theatre burned down on October 30, 1882.

In 1882 Abbey and Schoeffel invited Maurice Grau to join them. Grau had been managing light opera companies for some time before striking out on his own with the Maurice Grau Opera Company, which in 1881 had given a five-week season at the Teatro Solis in Montevideo, Uruguay. With a Brazilian conductor named Gravenstein they presented a mix of grand opera and operettas: La traviata in French, Carmen, Donizetti's La fille du régiment, Thomas' Mignon, Victor Massé's Paul et Virginie, Offenbach's La Périchole and Lecocq's Giroflé-Girofla. The three men formed the company of Abbey, Schoeffel and Grau to present grand opera. The partnership continued until the death of Mr. Abbey whose methods eventually cost him all his fortune and deprived Mr. Grau as well of his savings.

They presented the 1883-4 opening season of the 'old' New York Metropolitan Opera House, which was a critical success but a financial failure. Abbey as manager was personally responsible for losses of $250,000. The London-based banker Henry F. Gillig lost $200,000 in the Abbey-Grau Met debut.

The firm returned to light opera and touring European acts including Henry Irving and Ellen Terry from 1884. From 1887 to 1888 they leased the Star Theatre (844 Broadway at 13th Street, previously Wallack's Theatre), and also from 11 October 1887 to July 1888 the then current Wallack's Theatre on 30th Street and Broadway. They built the Tremont Theatre, Boston in 1888, managed by Schoeffel.

Abbey, Schoeffel and Grau again took up the challenge of grand opera, with a short season with Adelina Patti in 1887 at the Met, and in 1888 at the Teatro Solis, Montevideo; this was followed by a season of grand opera at the Auditorium Theatre in Chicago in 1889, and tours of the US with Patti, Nordica, and Albani in 1890. They returned to the Met in 1891, with Abbey managing for five years. Abbey's Theatre (at 1396 Broadway and West 38th Street) was built in 1893.

By 1895 the firm of Abbey, Schoeffel and Grau was in severe financial difficulties, and asked for extension of time to meet their obligations. The indebtedness was completely paid off. However, on 22 May 1896 the company failed with unsecured liabilities of $369,419.36 and actual assets of $162,54.85. Abbey had been ill. On June 30 the directors of the Metropolitan Opera and Real Estate Company renewed their lease and continued with their contract to produce grand opera. The creditors received 40% preferred stock and 60% in notes of the firm of Abbey, Schoeffel and Grau, which had been newly incorporated in July 1896 with $500,000 capital, of which $200,000 was preferred stock. The new organisation started free from debt, but Abbey died in October 1896.

Schoeffel and Grau continued in business, with Grau taking over the management of the Met from 1896 to 1897, and of Covent Garden from 1897 to 1900. Grau left the Met at the end of 1902–3 season, retired to Paris and died in 1907. Schoeffel continued to manage the Tremont Theatre in Boston until his death in 1918.

References
Notes

Sources
 

Impresarios
Former theatres in Manhattan
Theatres in Boston
Metropolitan Opera
Theatre managers and producers
1880 establishments in New York (state)